SES-15 is a geostationary communications satellite operated by SES S.A. and designed and manufactured by Boeing Satellite Systems.

See also 
 SES S.A.
 List of SES satellites

References 

Communications satellites in geostationary orbit
SES satellites
Satellites of Luxembourg
Spacecraft launched in 2017
2017 in Luxembourg
Satellites using the BSS-702 bus
Spacecraft launched by Soyuz-2 rockets